Osvaldo Desideri (born 16 February 1939) is an Italian art director. He won an Academy Award in the category Best Art Direction for the film The Last Emperor.

Selected filmography
 The Last Emperor (1987)

References

External links

1939 births
Living people
Italian art directors
Film people from Rome
Best Art Direction Academy Award winners
David di Donatello winners
Ciak d'oro winners